Saint James Parish may refer to:

 Saint James Parish, Barbados
 Saint James Parish, Jamaica
 Saint James Parish, New Brunswick, Canada
 St. James Parish, Louisiana, U.S.
 Parish of St James, Cumberland, New South Wales, Australia
 Westminster St James, or St. James Parish, London, UK

Parish name disambiguation pages